Zanzibar is a 1940 American adventure film directed by Harold Schuster and starring James Craig, Lola Lane and Eduardo Ciannelli.

Premise
An expedition in Africa seeks a mysterious skull.

Cast
Lola Lane as Jan Browning
James Craig as Steve Marland
Eduardo Ciannelli as Koski
Tom Fadden as Rhad Ramsey
Robert C. Fischer as The Sultan
Henry Victor as Nate Simpson
Clarence Muse as Bino
Samuel S. Hinds as Dale
Oscar O'Shea as Captain Craig
Abner Biberman as Aba
Lionel Pape as Michael Drayton
Everett Brown as Umboga

Production
James Craig had just signed a contract with Universal. Lola Lane had leapt to fame in Four Daughters (1938). The film was originally known as River of Missing Men and started filming in December 1939.

References

External links

Zanzibar at TCMDB
Zanzibar at BFI
Review of film at New York Times

1940 films
American adventure films
1940s English-language films
Films directed by Harold D. Schuster
1940 adventure films
Universal Pictures films
American black-and-white films
1940s American films